Bruce Alec Wilson (born June 20, 1951) is a former NASL and Canadian international soccer player. He played the second most games of any player in the former league, 299 (276 regular season and 23 playoff).  He also captained the Canadian team at the 1986 FIFA World Cup finals. In 2012 as part of the Canadian Soccer Association's centennial celebration, he was named to the all-time Canada XI men's team.

Playing career
After starting his career as an attacking player, he switched to outside fullback where his career flourished in the NASL. He played for the Vancouver Whitecaps from 1974 to 1977, the Chicago Sting in 1978 and 1979, the New York Cosmos in 1980, and the Toronto Blizzard from 1981 to 1984.  He was a six-time all-star selection, including three first-team selections (Vancouver in 1977, Chicago in 1979, Toronto in 1984).

Wilson made 57 international "A" appearances for Canada, a record he held at retirement until it was surpassed by Mike Sweeney.  In 1998, he was selected to a CONCACAF "team of the century", the only Canadian to receive the honour.  Wilson also represented Canada at the 1984 Los Angeles Olympics at a time when lower-ranked countries were allowed to field professional players.  The Canadian team reached the quarter-final stage, losing to Brazil.

Wilson became player-coach of the post-NASL Blizzard in 1985 when they were known as Toronto Inex.  The Wilson-led Inex played one season of friendlies against touring sides including Linfield and Everton before shutting down.  Wilson became head coach of the University of Victoria men's soccer team in 1987, retiring at the end of the 2022 season. He also coached the Victoria Vistas in the Canadian Soccer League.

In 2000 Wilson was inducted into the Canadian Soccer Hall of Fame. In 2003, he was also elected to the U.S. Soccer Hall of Fame.

Coaching career
Wilson has been head coach of the University of Victoria Vikes for over three decades.

References

External links
University of Victoria
 / Canada Soccer Hall of Fame
Canada Soccer Hall of Fame
 National Soccer Hall of Fame (in America)

1951 births
Living people
Soccer players from Vancouver
Canada men's national soccer team managers
Canada men's international soccer players
Canadian soccer coaches
Canadian soccer players
Canadian expatriate soccer players
Expatriate soccer players in the United States
Canadian expatriate sportspeople in the United States
North American Soccer League (1968–1984) players
North American Soccer League (1968–1984) indoor players
Vancouver Whitecaps (1974–1984) players
Chicago Sting (NASL) players
New York Cosmos players
Toronto Blizzard (1971–1984) players
Olympic soccer players of Canada
Footballers at the 1984 Summer Olympics
1986 FIFA World Cup players
National Soccer Hall of Fame members
Canada Soccer Hall of Fame inductees
Vancouver Columbus players
CONCACAF Championship-winning players
Association football defenders